Marcelo Nicolas Medina Zamora (San Vicente de Tagua Tagua, Chile, February 11 of 1980) is a footballer from Chile. He plays as a defender with San Marcos in the Primera División de Chile using the jersey No. 4.

External links
Profile at BDFA

O'Higgins F.C. footballers
Ñublense footballers
Coquimbo Unido footballers
Living people
1980 births
Chilean footballers
Association football defenders
People from Cachapoal Province